Bingoboys was an Austrian dance music trio from Vienna consisting of DJs Klaus Biedermann, Paul Pfab and Helmut Wolfgruber.

They had two chart entries on the U.S. Billboard Hot Dance Club Play chart in 1991. Their debut single, "How to Dance", featuring Princessa, hit #1 on the dance chart and climbed to #25 on the Billboard Hot 100. It contained samples from "Dance, Dance, Dance (Yowsah, Yowsah, Yowsah)" by Chic, "Dance (Disco Heat)" by Sylvester, "Kiss" by Art of Noise featuring Tom Jones, the popular James Brown "Yeah! Woo!" sample loop, the bassline motif from Mantronix's single "Got to Have Your Love", a synth motif from The Whispers' "And the Beat Goes On", and spoken male dialogue from a K-tel disco instructional album released in the 1970s.

A follow-up single, a cover of The SOS Band's song "Borrowed Love," hit #32 on the dance chart and #71 on the Hot 100 later in the year.  Princessa rapped on that track while featured vocals were performed by Arnold Jarvis. That same year, Bingoboys remixed three songs by Falco ("Der Kommissar", "Junge Roemer" and "Wiener Blut") for Falco's album, The Remix Hit Collection.

Discography

Albums

Singles

References

See also
List of artists who reached number one on the US Dance chart

Austrian house music groups
Austrian DJs
Austrian musical trios
Musical groups established in 1990